Donamaria is a town and municipality located in the province and autonomous community of Navarre in northern Spain.

References

External links
 DONAMARIA in the Bernardo Estornés Lasa - Auñamendi Encyclopedia (Euskomedia Fundazioa) 

Municipalities in Navarre